The International Phonetic Alphabet, or IPA, is an alphabetic system of phonetic notation based primarily on the Latin alphabet. It was devised by the International Phonetic Association as a standardized representation of the sounds of spoken language.

In the IPA, a pulmonic consonant is a consonant made by obstructing the glottis (the space between the vocal cords) or oral cavity (the mouth) and either simultaneously or subsequently letting out air from the lungs. Pulmonic consonants make up the majority of consonants in the IPA, as well as in human language. All consonants in the English language fall into this category.

In the audio samples below, the consonants are pronounced with the vowel [a] for demonstration.

See also
 IPA vowel chart with audio 
 IPA non-pulmonic consonant chart with audio

References

International Phonetic Alphabet